This is a list of species in the genus Paravilla.

Paravilla species

 Paravilla acutula Hall, 1981
 Paravilla albata Hall, 1981
 Paravilla albicera Hall, 1981
 Paravilla apicola (Cole, 1952)
 Paravilla aridula Hall, 1981
 Paravilla borea Hall, 1981
 Paravilla californica Hall, 1981
 Paravilla castanea (Jaennicke, 1867)
 Paravilla cinerea (Cole, 1923)
 Paravilla consul (Osten Sacken, 1886)
 Paravilla cunicula (Osten Sacken, 1886)
 Paravilla deserta Hall, 1981
 Paravilla diagonalis (Loew, 1869)
 Paravilla edititoides (Painter, 1933)
 Paravilla eminens Hall, 1981
 Paravilla emulata (Painter, 1962)
 Paravilla epheba (Osten Sacken, 1886)
 Paravilla eurhinata (Bigot, 1892)
 Paravilla extremitis (Coquillett, 1902)
 Paravilla flavipilosa (Cole, 1923)
 Paravilla floridensis Hall, 1981
 Paravilla fulvicoma (Coquillett, 1887)
 Paravilla fumida (Coquillett, 1887)
 Paravilla fumosa Hall, 1981
 Paravilla hulli Hall, 1981
 Paravilla imitans Hall, 1981
 Paravilla inatra Hall, 1981
 Paravilla lacunaris (Coquillett, 1892)
 Paravilla leucothoa (Wiedemann, 1830)
 Paravilla lucida Hall, 1981
 Paravilla macneilli Hall, 1981
 Paravilla mercedis (Coquillett, 1887)
 Paravilla mexicana Hall, 1981
 Paravilla montivaga Hall, 1981
 Paravilla nigriventris Hall, 1981
 Paravilla nigrofemorata Hall, 1981
 Paravilla nigronasica (Painter, 1933)
 Paravilla opaca Hall, 1981
 Paravilla painterorum Hall, 1981
 Paravilla palliata (Loew, 1869)
 Paravilla pallida Hall, 1981
 Paravilla parasitica Hall, 1981
 Paravilla parvula Hall, 1981
 Paravilla perplexa (Coquillett, 1887)
 Paravilla separata (Walker, 1852)
 Paravilla spaldingi (Painter, 1933)
 Paravilla splendida Hall, 1981
 Paravilla syrtis (Coquillett, 1887)
 Paravilla texana Hall, 1981
 Paravilla tricellula (Cole, 1952)
 Paravilla vigilans (Coquillett, 1887)
 Paravilla winburni Hall, 1981
 Paravilla xanthina (Painter, 1933)

References